James or Jimmy Franks may refer to:
 Jimmy Franks (ice hockey) (1914–1994), Canadian ice hockey goaltender
 Jimmy Pop (born 1972), born James Franks, US musician and Bloodhound Gang lead-singer
 Jimmy Franks Recording Company, record label owned by Jimmy Pop

See also
Jamie Franks (disambiguation)

Franks, James